UKHotList, originally Hit40UK and UKHot40, is a televised Top 40/20 chart show produced by The Box Plus Network for 4Music, The Box and Box Hits.

The show was originally based on Hit40UK, a former radio chart show that aired from 2003 until 2009. Unlike the official UK Singles Chart broadcast by BBC Radio 1, the Hit40UK chart included only the digital downloads and airplay in the UK, whereas the Official Chart includes physical, audio streams and download sales with no radio airplay.

Since 2015, the show, now UKHotList, is complied by Spotify and counts down the most streamed tracks of the week on the platform. Plus there are other versions of the show such as UKHotList: Kiss Edition, a version of the show on Kiss TV, and UKHotList of (year), where the most streamed tracks of the year are counted.

See also
Hit40UK

External links
UK HOT LIST on Behance

British record charts
Music chart shows